The 1932 Calgary municipal election was held on November 23, 1932 to elect seven Aldermen to sit on Calgary City Council. Along with positions on Calgary City Council, a Commissioner, three trustees for the Public School Board, and two trustees for the Separate School Board.

Calgary City Council governed under "Initiative, Referendum and Recall" which is composed of a Mayor, Commissioner and twelve Aldermen all elected to staggered two year terms. Mayor Andrew Davison and six Aldermen: Harold William Hounsfield Riley, Jean Romeo Cyr-Miquelon, Samuel Stanley Savage, Pansy Louise Pue, and Robert Henry Weir elected in 1931 continued in their positions.

Edith Patterson who was elected in 1931 resigned from Calgary City Council on November 7, 1932.

Background
The election was held under the Single Transferable Voting/Proportional Representation (STV/PR) with the term for candidates being two years. Calgary had an estimated 53,000 eligible voters.

Arthur Garnet Graves who had served as Commissioner prior to the election spent much of the campaign denying rumors he owned shares of businesses in the city and an estate in England. At nomination day, the Calgary Daily Herald editorial board supported Graves candidacy for Commissioner owing to his experience in the role and Riley's lack of civic experience.

Results
Results from Calgary Daily Herald.

Commissioner

Council
Quota for election was 2,140.

Public School Board
The quota was 3,053

Separate school board

See also
List of Calgary municipal elections

References

1930s in Calgary
Municipal elections in Calgary
1932 elections in Canada